Al-Hadi Mosque or Al-Imam Al-Hadi Mosque is one of the historical mosques of the ancient city of Sa'ada, Yemen. It is located east–west of the city, was built in around 897 C.E., and is named after Imam Yahya Bin Al-Hussein, the founder of the state of Imams of Yemen. The mosque became the oldest place for the teaching of Zaidi maddhab in the Arabian Peninsula.

History
The mosque is the third mosque in Yemen to be built adjunct with a minaret, after the Mosque of Farwa Ibn Masik, and the Great Mosque of Sana'a. It is also the oldest mosque attached to the houses of the Muhajirun. On May 9, 2015, the mosque was attacked by the Saudi-led coalition, which caused severe damage.

Architecture
The mosque consists of an open courtyard in the centre surrounded by four corridors, the deepest of which is the qibla hallway. It can be accessed through thirteen doors. The two main minarets are located in the courtyard. One of them is among the tallest in Yemen, reaching around 52 meters high, while another one in the southern part of the courtyard is smaller. The complex contains many architectural elements influenced by different architectural styles, exemplified in the façade for instance. There is also a wooden platform in which the oldest part contains an inscription dating back to the year of 922, as well as eight wooden structures with various rows of Arabic ornaments. There are also numerous tombstones with engraving in the stone, illustrates the creativity, ability and skill of the calligraphers in Yemen throughout the Islamic ages. They also carried out the geometric, floral and inscriptive decorations on the walls of the mosque in a variety of plaster, regarded executed with unmatched perfection.

See also
 Islam in Yemen
 List of mosques in Yemen

References

9th-century mosques
Mosques in Yemen